Little Everdon is a small hamlet in the civil parish of Everdon  in the county of Northamptonshire, England. Lying on the Nene Way long-distance footpath, its parkland, large stone houses and manor house are typical of English countryside.

The hamlets name means 'Wild boar hill'.

References

External links 
 Great & Little Everdon Website

Villages in Northamptonshire
West Northamptonshire District